Callao is a Peruvian seaside city and region on the Pacific Ocean in the Lima metropolitan area. Callao is Peru's chief seaport and home to its main airport, Jorge Chávez International Airport. Callao municipality consists of the whole Callao Region, which is also coterminous with the Province of Callao. Founded in 1537 by the Spaniards, the city has a long naval history as one of the main ports in Latin America and the Pacific, as it was one of vital Spanish towns during the colonial era.

History

El Callao was founded by Spanish colonists in 1537, just two years after Lima (1535). The origin of its name is unknown; both Amerindian (particularly Yunga, or Coastal Peruvian) and Spanish sources are credited, but it is certain that it was known by that name since 1550.  Other sources point to the similarity with the Portuguese word calhau [pebble], having a similar sound.

It soon became the main port for Spanish commerce in the Pacific. At the height of the Viceroyalty, virtually all goods produced in Peru, Bolivia, and Argentina were carried over the Andes by mule to Callao, to be shipped to Panama, carried overland, and then transported on to Spain via Cuba. The port of Callao was also a node in the Manila galleon route connecting Latin-America and Asia through Acapulco, Mexico and Manila, Philippines. As a result, Callao also became a permanent target for pirate and corsair attacks, such as the one carried out by Francis Drake in 1579 and the blockade established by Jacques l'Hermite in 1624.

After the Battle of Ayacucho, 9 December 1824, that sealed the independence of Peru and South America, Spain made futile attempts to retain its former colonies, such as at the second siege of Callao. On 20 August 1836, during the Peru–Bolivian Confederation, President Andrés de Santa Cruz mandated the creation of the Callao Littoral Province (Provincia Litoral del Callao), which had political autonomy in its internal affairs. During the government of President Ramón Castilla, Callao was given the name of Constitutional Province (Provincia Constitucional), on 22 April 1857; before that, Callao had the name of Littoral Province. All of the other Peruvian provinces had been given their names by law, while Callao was given it by constitutional mandate.

Callao was never part of the Lima Department nor of any other departments.

The province's first mayor was Col. Manuel Cipriano Dulanto.

In 1921, the Bureau of Public Works granted a concession to M.I.T. engineer John Tinker Glidden for paving, administering, and inaugurating a public cart road between Callao and Lima, further coalescing a Lima metropolitan area.

By 1949, Callao was known as one of the biggest centers of coca-based products and cocaine traffic in the world.

Notable events
On 28 October 1746, a tsunami caused by the 1746 Lima–Callao earthquake destroyed the entire port of Callao.
On 22 January 1826, besieged by nationalist forces backed by Simón Bolívar, General José Ramón Rodil surrendered Callao to General .
On 2 May 1866, during the Battle of Callao, the Spanish fleet tried to reconquer independent Peru.
Kon-Tiki left Callao, Peru, on the afternoon of 28 April 1947.
On 19 June 1986, the Peruvian prison massacres took place.

City highlights
Callao is built on and around a peninsula, the district of La Punta, a wealthy residential neighborhood. A historical fortress, the Castillo de Real Felipe (site of "Rodil's Last Stand"), stands on the promontory overlooking the harbor.

A large naval base is sited in Callao. Its prison held Abimael Guzmán, the leader of the Shining Path Communist Party of Peru, and holds Vladimiro Montesinos, the ex-director of internal security during the Fujimori regime.

Jorge Chávez International Airport is located in Callao.

On a bluff overlooking the harbor sits Colegio Militar Leoncio Prado, the military high school. The city also has a university, the National University of Callao.

The main Naval Hospital, Centro Medico Naval is located on Avenida Venezuela in Bellavista. It contains the U.S. Navy command Naval Medical Research Unit Six.

Residents of Callao are known as chalacos.

Callao's professional football teams are Sport Boys and Atlético Chalaco.

Islands

Callao has several islands: San Lorenzo (currently a military base), El Frontón (a former high security prison), the Cavinzas Islands, and the Palomino Islands, where numerous sea lions and sea birds live in a virtually untouched ecosystem. There are proposed plans to build a huge naval, terrestrial, and air port on San Lorenzo Island. This project is called the San Lorenzo Megaport Project.

Law and government
Local government affairs are divided into two levels. Regional matters are handled by the Regional Government of Callao (Gobierno Regional del Callao), which is located in front of the Jorge Chávez International Airport. Affairs such as city cleaning, promoting of sports and basic services are handled by the Provincial Municipality of Callao, which is headquartered in the Callao District. Also, each of the six districts has its own Municipality which handles matters in their respective jurisdictional areas.

Administrative divisions
Callao is divided into seven districts, (singular: distrito), each of which is headed by a mayor (alcalde).

Crime 
Callao is one of the most dangerous areas in Peru and experiences the most crime. The main port city in Peru is known as one of the largest exit points of cocaine and is rife with organized crime that results with violence. In December 2015, the government declared Callao in a state of emergency that extended until April 2016, with more than 30 people being killed at the time. In 2016, the murder rate in Callao was double the national average; from 10.2 per 100,000 in 2011 to 15.2 in 2015, compared to Lima which saw 4.8 per 100,000 in 2011 and 5.0 per 100,000 in 2015. Despite government and cultural initiatives, crime has continued to increase in Callao, with some public events in the area ending in gunfire.

Transportation

Airport 
Jorge Chávez International Airport (IATA: LIM, ICAO: SPJC), known as Aeropuerto Internacional Jorge Chávez in Spanish, is Peru's main international and domestic airport. It is located in Callao district,  norwest, from the Historic Centre of Lima. Callao is the port city now fully integrated with Lima, the nation's capital. In 2008, the airport handled 8,288,506 passengers and 98,733 aircraft movements.

For many years it was the hub for now defunct Aeroperú and Compañía de Aviación Faucett, one of the oldest airlines in Latin America. Now it serves as a hub for many aviation companies such as Avianca Perú, Viva Air Perú, and LATAM Perú.

Railway 
The port is served by the  Ferrocarril Central Andino.

Notable people
 
 
Alexander Callens (born 1992), Peruvian footballer
Mario Montalbetti (born 1953), Peruvian syntactician and linguistics professor
Claudio Pizarro (born 1978), highest-scoring Latin American in the history of the Bundesliga
Jhoao Ward (born 1989), Peruvian footballer

See also
 Callao affair, 1820
 Battle of Callao (1838)
 Battle of Callao, 1866 
 Blockades of Callao, several events
 Siege of Callao (disambiguation), several events

References

External links
 
 
 Municipality of Callao (in Spanish)
 Regional government of Callao
 Jorge Chavez International Airport
 National University of Callao (in Spanish)

 
Provinces of the Callao Region
Port cities in Peru
1537 establishments in the Spanish Empire
1537 establishments in South America
Populated places established in 1537
Regional capital cities in Peru